Amauna is a village located in the Bikramganj Block of Rohtas district in the Indian state of Bihar.

References

Villages in Rohtas district